Tragon signaticornis is a species of beetle in the family Cerambycidae. It was described by Chevrolat in 1855. It is known from Nigeria, Ghana, Senegal, Cameroon, Sierra Leone, the Ivory Coast, and Togo.

References

Pachystolini
Beetles described in 1855